Bakrid is a 2019 Indian Tamil language drama film written and directed by Jagadeesan Subu. The film stars Vikranth and a camel called Sarah. The film is the first Indian and Tamil film in Kollywood history to portray a camel in the pivotal role. The film is bankrolled by M10 Productions and the music is composed by D. Imman. This film received positive reviews.

Plot 
Rathinam (Vikranth), a fledgling farmer in Tamil Nadu, accidentally comes into possession of a camel calf. Charmed by the animal, Rathinam decides to keep him as a pet. With time, Rathinam realises that his humble home, despite all the affection showered, might not be the best place for a camel. To ensure the animal lives in his natural setting, he sets out on an unusual road trip to Rajasthan.

Cast 
 Vikranth as Rathinam
 Sara the camel
 Vasundhara as Geetha
 Rohit Pathak as Lorry driver
 Dinesh Prabhakar as Sundaram
 Mogli K. Mohan as Lorry driver's assistant
 Pasupathi Raj
 H. L. Shrutika as Vasuki
 Dakshayini as Radha
 Sethupathi Jayachandran as Arul
 M. S. Bhaskar as Veterinarian (guest appearance)
 Vinoddh Bhandarri as Pondicherry saitt

Production 
The film was launched in late August 2018 and the shooting of the film commenced on 21 August 2018. The first look poster (which includes Vikranth sitting close to the camel) of the film was unveiled by music director Anirudh Ravichander through his Twitter account. It was reported that Vikranth had signed for the film to play the lead role while he was shooting for his upcoming film, Suttu Pidikka Utharavu. The plot of the film is mainly based on the camel's story, in fact it went onto become the first Indian film to feature camel in a prominent role. This is also the first kind of Indian film to reveal the exploration of the bond shared between a man and a camel. A camel named Sarah from the state of Rajasthan was chosen to cast it in lead role when the shooting took place in Rajasthan. It was revealed that Vikranth had training sessions with the camel for over two months in order to fit for the making of the film. Before the production of the film, the filmmakers received special permission from the Animal Welfare Board to shoot with a camel. The portions of the film were shot in Chennai, Goa, Rajasthan and Maharashtra. Anthony L. Ruben was roped in for editing and the cinematography is handled by the director himself.

Marketing 
The official teaser of the film was unveiled on 8 February 2019.

Soundtrack 

The soundtrack of the film is composed by D. Imman, with lyrics by Gnanakaravel and Mani Amuthavan.

References

External links
 

2010s Tamil-language films
Indian drama films
Films shot in Rajasthan
Films shot in Goa
Films shot in Maharashtra
Films shot in Chennai
Films about camels
Films scored by D. Imman
2019 films